The Khedivate of Egypt ( or ,) was an autonomous tributary state of the Ottoman Empire, established and ruled by the Muhammad Ali Dynasty following the defeat and expulsion of Napoleon Bonaparte's forces which brought an end to the short-lived French occupation of Lower Egypt. The Khedivate of Egypt had also expanded to control present-day Sudan, South Sudan, Eritrea, Djibouti, north western Somalia, north Eastern Ethiopia, Israel, Lebanon, Jordan, Syria, Greece, Cyprus, southern and central Turkey, in addition to parts from Libya, Chad, Central African Republic, and Democratic Republic of Congo, as well as northwestern Saudi Arabia, parts of Yemen and the Kingdom of Hejaz.

The United Kingdom invaded and took control in 1882. In 1914 the Ottoman Empire connection was ended and Britain established a protectorate called the Sultanate of Egypt.

History

Rise of Muhammad Ali 

Upon the conquest of the Sultanate of Egypt by the Ottoman Empire in 1517, the country was governed as an Ottoman eyalet (province). The Ottoman Porte (government) was content to permit local rule to remain in the hands of the Mamluks, the Egyptian military led by Circassian-Turkic origin leaders who had held power in Egypt since the 13th century. Save for military expeditions to crush Mamluk Egyptian uprisings seeking to re-establish
the independent Egyptian sultanate, the Ottomans largely ignored Egyptian affairs until the French invasion of Egypt in 1798.

Between 1799 and 1801, the Porte, working at times with France's main enemy, Great Britain, undertook various campaigns to restore Ottoman rule in Egypt. By August 1801, the remaining French forces of General Jacques-François Menou withdrew from Egypt.

The period between 1801 and 1805 was, effectively, a three-way civil war in Egypt between the Egyptian Mamluks, the Ottoman Turks, and troops the Ottoman Porte dispatched from Rumelia (the Empire's European province), under the command of Muhammad Ali Pasha, to restore the Empire's authority.

Following the defeat of the French, the Porte assigned Koca Hüsrev Mehmed Pasha as the new Wāli (governor) of Egypt, tasking him to kill or imprison the surviving Egyptian Mamluk beys. Many of these were freed by or fled with the British, while others held Minya between Upper and Lower Egypt.

Amid these disturbances, Koca Hüsrev Mehmed Pasha attempted to disband his Albanian bashi-bazouks (soldiers) without pay. This led to rioting that drove Koca Hüsrev Mehmed Pasha from Cairo. During the ensuing turmoil, the Porte sent Muhammad Ali Pasha to Egypt.

However, Muhammad Ali seized control of Egypt, declaring himself ruler of Egypt and quickly consolidating an independent local powerbase. After repeated failed attempts to remove and kill him, in 1805, the Porte officially recognised Muhammad Ali as Wāli of Egypt. Demonstrating his grander ambitions, Muhammad Ali Pasha claimed for himself the higher title of Khedive (Viceroy), ruling the self-proclaimed (but not recognised) Khedivate of Egypt. He murdered the remaining Mamluk beys in 1811, solidifying his own control of Egypt.  He is regarded as the founder of modern Egypt because of the dramatic reforms he instituted in the military, agricultural, economic and cultural spheres.

Reforms
During Muhammad Ali's absence in Arabia his representative at Cairo had completed the confiscation, begun in 1808, of almost all the lands belonging to private individuals, who were forced to accept instead inadequate pensions. By this revolutionary method of land nationalization Muhammad Ali became proprietor of nearly all the soil of Egypt, an iniquitous measure against which the Egyptians had no remedy.

The pasha also attempted to reorganize his troops on European lines, but this led to a formidable mutiny in Cairo. Muhammad Ali's life was endangered, and he sought refuge by night in the citadel, while the soldiery committed many acts of plunder. The revolt was reduced by presents to the chiefs of the insurgents, and Muhammad Ali ordered that the sufferers by the disturbances should receive compensation from the treasury. The project of the Nizam Gedid (New System) was, in consequence of this mutiny, abandoned for a time.

While Ibrahim was engaged in the second Arabian campaign the pasha turned his attention to strengthening the Egyptian economy.  He created state monopolies over the chief products of the country.  He set up a number of factories and began digging in 1819 a new canal to Alexandria, called the Mahmudiya (after the reigning sultan of Turkey). The old canal had long fallen into decay, and the necessity of a safe channel between Alexandria and the Nile was much felt.  The conclusion in 1838 of a commercial treaty with Turkey, negotiated by Sir Henry Bulwer (Lord Darling), struck a deathblow to the system of monopolies, though the application of the treaty to Egypt was delayed for some years.

Another notable fact in the economic progress of the country was the development of the cultivation of cotton in the Delta in 1822 and onwards. The cotton grown had been brought from the Sudan by Maho Bey, and the organization of the new industry from which in a few years Muhammad Ali was enabled to extract considerable revenues.

Efforts were made to promote education and the study of medicine. To European merchants, on whom he was dependent for the sale of his exports, Muhammad Ali showed much favor, and under his influence, the port of Alexandria again rose into importance. It was also under Muhammad Ali's encouragement that the overland transit of goods from Europe to India via Egypt was resumed.

Invasion of Libya and Sudan

In 1820 Muhammad Ali gave orders to commence the conquest of eastern Libya. He first sent an expedition westward (Feb. 1820) which conquered and annexed the Siwa oasis. Ali's intentions for Sudan was to extend his rule southward, to capture the valuable caravan trade bound for the Red Sea, and to secure the rich gold mines which he believed to exist in Sennar. He also saw in the campaign a means of getting rid of his disaffected troops, and of obtaining a sufficient number of captives to form the nucleus of the new army.

The forces destined for this service were led by Ismail, the youngest son of Muhammad Ali.  They consisted of between 4000 and 5000 men, being Albanians, Turks and Egyptians.  They left Cairo in July 1820. Nubia at once submitted, the Shaigiya tribe immediately beyond the province of Dongola were defeated, the remnant of the Mamluks dispersed, and Sennar was reduced without a battle.

Mahommed Bey, the defterdar, with another force of about the same strength, was then sent by Muhammad Ali against Kordofan with like result, but not without a hard-fought engagement. In October 1822, Ismail, with his retinue, was burnt to death by Nimr, the mek (king) of Shendi; and the defterdar, a man infamous for his cruelty, assumed the command of those provinces, and exacted terrible retribution from the inhabitants. Khartoum was founded at this time, and in the following years the rule of the Egyptians was greatly extended and control of the Red Sea ports of Suakin and Massawa obtained.

Greek campaign

Muhammad Ali was fully conscious that the empire which he had so laboriously built up might at any time have to be defended by force of arms against his master Sultan Mahmud II, whose whole policy had been directed to curbing the power of his too ambitious vassals, and who was under the influence of the personal enemies of the pasha of Egypt, notably of Koca Hüsrev Mehmed Pasha, the grand vizier, who had never forgiven his humiliation in Egypt in 1803.

Mahmud also was already planning reforms borrowed from the West, and Muhammad Ali, who had had plenty of opportunity of observing the superiority of European methods of warfare, was determined to anticipate the sultan in the creation of a fleet and an army on European lines, partly as a measure of precaution, partly as an instrument for the realization of yet wider schemes of ambition. Before the outbreak of the War of Greek Independence in 1821, he had already expended much time and energy in organizing a fleet and in training, under the supervision of French instructors, native officers and artificers; though it was not till 1829 that the opening of a dockyard and arsenal at Alexandria enabled him to build and equip his own vessels. By 1823, moreover, he had succeeded in carrying out the reorganization of his army on European lines, the turbulent Turkish and Albanian elements being replaced by Sudanese and fellahin. The effectiveness of the new force was demonstrated in the suppression of an 1823 revolt of the Albanians in Cairo by six disciplined Sudanese regiments; after which Mehemet Ali was no more troubled with military mutinies.

His foresight was rewarded by the invitation of the sultan to help him in the task of subduing the Greek insurgents, offering as reward the pashaliks of the Morea and of Syria. Muhammad Ali had already, in 1821, been appointed by him governor of Crete, which he had occupied with a small Egyptian force. In the autumn of 1824, a fleet of 60 Egyptian warships carrying a large force of 17,000 disciplined troops concentrated in Suda Bay, and, in the following March, with Ibrahin as commander-in-chief landed in the Morea.

His naval superiority wrested from the Greeks the command of a great deal of the sea, on which the fate of the insurrection ultimately depended, while on land the Greek irregular bands, having largely soundly beaten the Porte's troops, had finally met a worthy foe in Ibrahim's disciplined troops. The history of the events that led up to the battle of Navarino and the liberation of Greece is told elsewhere; the withdrawal of the Egyptians from the Morea was ultimately due to the action of Admiral Sir Edward Codrington, who early in August 1828 appeared before Alexandria and induced the pasha, by no means sorry to have a reasonable excuse, by a threat of bombardment, to sign a convention undertaking to recall Ibrahim and his army. But for the action of European powers, it is suspected by many that the Ottoman Empire might have defeated the Greeks.

Wars against the Turks 

Although Muhammad Ali had only been granted the title of wali, he proclaimed himself khedive, or hereditary viceroy, early on during his rule.  The Ottoman government, although irritated, did nothing until Muhammad Ali invaded Ottoman-ruled Syria in 1831.  The governorship of Syria had been promised him by the sultan, Mahmud II, for his assistance during the Greek War of Independence, but the title was not granted to him after the war. This caused the Ottomans, allied with the British, to counter-attack in 1839.

In 1840, the British bombarded Beirut and an Anglo-Ottoman force landed and seized Acre. The Egyptian army was forced to retreat back home, and Syria again became an Ottoman province.  As a result of the Convention of London (1840), Muhammad Ali gave up all conquered lands with the exception of the Sudan and was, in turn, granted the hereditary governorship of the Sudan.

Muhammad Ali's successors 

By 1848, Muhammad Ali was old and senile enough for his tuberculosis-ridden son, Ibrahim, to demand his accession to the governorship.  The Ottoman sultan acceded to the demands, and Muhammad Ali was removed from power.  However, Ibrahim died of his disease months later, outlived by his father, who died in 1849.

Ibrahim was succeeded by his nephew Abbas I, who undid many of Muhammad Ali's accomplishments.  Abbas was assassinated by two of his slaves in 1854, and Muhammad Ali's fourth son, Sa'id, succeeded him.  Sa'id brought back many of his father's policies but otherwise had an unremarkable reign.

Invasion of East Africa 
In the early 19th Century the Egyptians tried multiple attempts to take full control of the Nile River and with that take control of the Horn of Africa which was a Key route to enter the Southern Arabian peninsula. After failing multiple times to take control of the Bogos/Hamassien however these attempted invasions were repelled by the emperor at the time Tewedros.

Sa'id ruled for only nine years, and his nephew Isma'il, another grandson of Muhammad Ali, became wali. In 1866 the polity occupied the Emirate of Harar. In 1867, the Ottoman sultan acknowledged Isma'il's use of the title khedive. In 1874, Ismail Pasha ordered the deputation of warships to patrol Tadjoura whereafter for ten years, the Khedivate was established from Zaylac to Berbera, until their withdrawal in April 1884 and failed attempts to establish themselves beyond Berbera and the eastern littoral of Somalia.

British occupation

In 1882 opposition to European control led to growing tension amongst native notables, the most dangerous opposition coming from the army. A large military demonstration in September 1881 forced the Khedive Tewfiq to dismiss his Prime Minister. In April 1882 France and Great Britain sent warships to Alexandria to bolster the Khedive amidst a turbulent climate, spreading fear of invasion throughout the country.
By June Egypt was in the hands of nationalists opposed to European domination of the country. A British naval bombardment of Alexandria had little effect on the opposition which led to the landing of a British expeditionary force at both ends of the Suez Canal in August 1882.  The British succeeded in defeating the Egyptian Army at Tel El Kebir in September and took control of the country putting Tewfiq back in control. The purpose of the invasion had been to restore political stability to Egypt under a government of the Khedive and international controls which were in place to streamline Egyptian financing since 1876.

British occupation ended nominally with the deposition of the last khedive Abbas II on 5 November 1914 and the establishment of a British protectorate, with the installation of sultan Hussein Kamel on 19 December 1914.

Sanctioned khedival rule (1867–1914)

European influence 

By Isma'il's reign, the Egyptian government, headed by the minister Nubar Pasha, had become dependent on Britain and France for a healthy economy.  Isma'il attempted to end this European dominance, while at the same time pursuing an aggressive domestic policy.  Under Isma'il, 112 canals and 400 bridges were built in Egypt.

Because of his efforts to gain economic independence from the European powers, Isma'il became unpopular with many British and French diplomats, including Evelyn Baring and Alfred Milner, who claimed that he was "ruining Egypt."

In 1869, the completion of the Suez Canal gave Britain a faster route to India.  This made Egypt increasingly reliant on Britain for both military and economic aid.  Isma'il made no effort to reconcile with the European powers, who pressured the Ottoman sultan into removing him from power.

Tewfik and the loss of Sudan 

Isma'il was succeeded by his eldest son Tewfik, who, unlike his younger brothers, had not been educated in Europe.  He pursued a policy of closer relations with Britain and France but his authority was undermined in a rebellion led by his war minister, Urabi Pasha, in 1882.  Urabi took advantage of violent riots in Alexandria to seize control of the government and temporarily depose Tewfik.

British naval forces shelled and captured Alexandria, and an expeditionary force under General Sir Garnet Wolseley was formed in England.  The British army landed in Egypt soon afterwards and defeated Urabi's army in the Battle of Tel el-Kebir. Urabi was tried for treason and sentenced to death, but the sentence was commuted to exile.  After the revolt, the Egyptian army was reorganized on a British model and commanded by British officers.

Meanwhile, a religious rebellion had broken out in the Sudan, led by Muhammad Ahmed, who proclaimed himself the Mahdi.  The Mahdist rebels had seized the regional capital of Kordofan and annihilated two British-led expeditions sent to quell it. The British soldier-adventurer Charles George Gordon, an ex-governor of the Sudan, was sent to the Sudanese capital, Khartoum, with orders to evacuate its minority of European and Egyptian inhabitants. Instead of evacuating the city, Gordon prepared for a siege and held out from 1884 to 1885.  However, Khartoum eventually fell, and he was killed.

The British Gordon Relief Expedition was delayed by several battles and was thus unable to reach Khartoum and save Gordon.  The fall of Khartoum resulted in the proclamation of an Islamic state, ruled over first by the Mahdi and then by his successor Khalifa Abdullahi.

Reconquest of the Sudan 

In 1896, during the reign of Tewfik's son, Abbas II, a massive Anglo-Egyptian force, under the command of General Herbert Kitchener, began the reconquest of the Sudan. The Mahdists were defeated in the battles of Abu Hamid and Atbara.  The campaign was concluded with the Anglo-Egyptian victory of Omdurman, the Mahdist capital.

The Khalifa was hunted down and killed in 1899, in the Battle of Umm Diwaykarat, and Anglo-Egyptian rule was restored to the Sudan.

End of the Khedivate 

Abbas II became very hostile to the British as his reign drew on, and, by 1911, was considered by Lord Kitchener to be a "wicked little Khedive" worthy of deposition.

In 1914, when World War I broke out, the Ottoman Empire joined the Central Powers against Britain and France.  Britain now removed the nominal role of Constantinople, proclaimed a Sultanate of Egypt and abolished the Khedivate on 5 November 1914. Abbas II, who supported the Central Powers and was in Vienna for a state visit, was deposed from the Khedivate throne in his absence by the enforcement of the British military authorities in Cairo and was banned from returning to Egypt. He was succeeded by his uncle Hussein Kamel, who took the title of Sultan on 19 December 1914.

Economy

Currency 

During the khedivate, the standard form of Egyptian currency was the Egyptian pound.  Because of the gradual European domination of the Egyptian economy, the khedivate adopted the gold standard in 1885.

Adoption of European-style industries 

Although the adoption of modern, Western industrial techniques was begun under Muhammad Ali in the early 19th century, the policy was continued under the khedives.

Machines were imported into Egypt and by the abolition of the khedivate in 1914, the textile industry had become the most prominent one in the nation.

Notable events and people during khedival rule

Events 

Greek War of Independence (1821–1830)
Egyptian invasion of Syria (1831)
Oriental Crisis of 1840 (1840)
Crimean War
2nd Franco-Mexican War
Cretan Revolt
Serbian–Ottoman Wars (1876–1878)
Russo-Turkish War (1877–1878)
Completion of the Suez Canal (1869)
Urabi revolt (1881)
First Mahdist War (1881–1885)
Second Mahdist War (1896–1899)
Abolishment of the khedivate; establishment of the Sultanate of Egypt (1914)

People 

Muhammad Ali: First hereditary Ottoman governor of Egypt
Ibrahim: Muhammad Ali's son and successor (in 1848)
Abbas I: Ibrahim's successor
Sa'id: Abbas' successor
Isma'il: First khedive of Egypt; Sa'id's successor
Tewfik: Second khedive; Isma'il's successor
Abbas II of Egypt: Third and last khedive; Tewfik's successor
Hussein Kamel: Isma'il's son; first Sultan of Egypt
Nubar Pasha: Egyptian politician; often prime minister of Egypt
Ahmed Urabi: Egyptian soldier, war minister; leader of the Urabi revolt
Muhammad Ahmed: Self-proclaimed Mahdi; leader of the Sudanese Mahdist rebellion

List of khedives

See also
Khedive
Vassal and tributary states of the Ottoman Empire

References

Further reading
 Berridge, W. J. "Imperialist and Nationalist Voices in the Struggle for Egyptian independence, 1919–22." Journal of Imperial and Commonwealth History 42.3 (2014): 420–439.
 Botman, Selma. Egypt from Independence to Revolution, 1919–1952 (Syracuse UP, 1991).
 Cain, Peter J. "Character and imperialism: the British financial administration of Egypt, 1878–1914." Journal of imperial and Commonwealth history 34.2 (2006): 177–200.
 Cain, Peter J. "Character,'Ordered Liberty', and the Mission to Civilise: British Moral Justification of Empire, 1870–1914." Journal of Imperial and Commonwealth History 40.4 (2012): 557–578.
 Cole, Juan R.I. Colonialism and Revolution in the Middle East: The Social and Cultural Origins of Egypt's 'Urabi Revolt (Princeton UP, 1993.)
 Daly, M.W. The Cambridge History of Egypt Volume 2 Modern Egypt, from 1517 to the end of the twentieth century  (1998) pp 217–84 on 1879–1923. online
 Dunn, John P. Khedive Ismail's Army (2013)
 EzzelArab, AbdelAziz. "The experiment of Sharif Pasha's cabinet (1879): An inquiry into the historiography of Egypt's elite movement." International Journal of Middle East Studies 36.4 (2004): 561–589.
 Fahmy, Ziad.  "Media Capitalism: Colloquial Mass Culture and Nationalism in Egypt, 1908–1918", International Journal of Middle East Studies 42#1 (2010), 83–103.
 Goldberg, Ellis. "Peasants in Revolt – Egypt 1919", International Journal of Middle East Studies, Vol. 24 (1992), 261–80.
 Goldschmidt, Jr., Arthur, ed. Biographical Dictionary of Modern Egypt (Boulder, CO: Lynne Rienner, 1999).
 Goldschmidt, Jr., Arthur. ed. Historical Dictionary of Egypt (Scarecrow Press, 1994).
 Harrison, Robert T. Gladstone's Imperialism in Egypt: Techniques of Domination (1995).
 Hicks, Geoffrey. "Disraeli, Derby and the Suez Canal, 1875: some myths reassessed." History 97.326 (2012): 182–203.
 Hopkins, Anthony G. "The Victorians and Africa: a reconsideration of the occupation of Egypt, 1882." Journal of African History 27.2 (1986): 363–391.  [https://www.jstor.org/stable/181140 online
 Hunter, F. Robert. "State‐society relations in nineteenth‐century Egypt: the years of transition, 1848–79." Middle Eastern Studies 36.3 (2000): 145–159.
 Hunter. F. Robert.  Egypt Under the Khedives: 1805–1879: From Household Government to Modern Bureaucracy (2nd ed. Cairo: American University in Cairo Press, 1999.)
 Langer, William, L. European Alliances and Alignments: 1871–1890 (2nd ed. 1956) pp 251–80. online
 Marlowe, John. Cromer in Egypt (Praeger, 1970.)
 Owen, Roger.  Lord Cromer: Victorian Imperialist, Edwardian Proconsul (Oxford UP, 2004.)
 Pinfari, Marco. "The Unmaking of a Patriot: Anti-Arab Prejudice in the British Attitude towards the Urabi Revolt (1882)." Arab Studies Quarterly 34.2 (2012): 92–108. online
 Robinson, Ronald, and John Gallagher. Africa and the Victorians: The Climax of Imperialism (1961) pp 76–159. online
 Sayyid-Marsot, Afaf Lutfi. Egypt and Cromer; a Study in Anglo-Egyptian Relations (Praeger, 1969).
 Scholch, Alexander.  Egypt for the Egyptians!: the Socio-Political Crisis in Egypt, 1878–1882 (London: Ithaca Press, 1981.)
 Shock, Maurice.  "Gladstone's Invasion of Egypt, 1882" History Today (June 1957) 7#6 pp 351-357.
 Tassin, Kristin Shawn. "Egyptian nationalism, 1882–1919: elite competition, transnational networks, empire, and independence" (PhD Dissertation, U of Texas, 2014.) online; bibliography pp 269–92.
 Tignor, Robert L. Modernization and British colonial rule in Egypt, 1882–1914 (Princeton UP, 2015).
 Tucker, Judith E. Women in nineteenth-century Egypt (Cambridge UP, 1985).
 Ulrichsen, Kristian Coates. The First World War in the Middle East (Hurst, 2014).
 Walker, Dennis.  "Mustafa Kamil's Party: Islam, Pan-Islamism, and Nationalism", Islam in the Modern Age, Vol. 11 (1980), 230–9 and Vol. 12 (1981), 1–43

Primary sources
 Cromer, Earl of. Modern Egypt (2 vol 1908) online free  1220pp
 Milner, Alfred. England in Egypt (London, 1892). online
 Amira Sonbol, ed. The Last Khedive of Egypt: Memoirs of Abbas Hilmi II'' (Reading, UK: Ithaca Press, 1998).

States and territories established in 1867
States and territories disestablished in 1914
19th century in Egypt
20th century in Egypt
British colonisation in Africa
Egypt under the Muhammad Ali dynasty
Egypt Khedivate
Former British protectorates
Former British colonies and protectorates in Africa
History of Egypt (1900–present)
New Imperialism
Ottoman Egypt
1867 establishments in Africa
1914 disestablishments in Africa
1860s establishments in the Ottoman Empire
1880s establishments in the British Empire
20th-century disestablishments in Egypt
Vassal states of the Ottoman Empire